Trish Goff (born June 8, 1976) is an American model, actress and real estate broker.

Early life and career 
Goff was born and raised in Northern Florida. She was discovered by a modeling scout at the age of 15. After being discovered, she dropped out of school and moved to New York City to pursue a career in modeling. She has appeared on the cover of a variety of international editions of Vogue and in several Victoria's Secret Fashion Shows.  Goff also appeared in campaigns for Banana Republic, Chanel, Chloé, Christian Dior, Gap, Pollini, Ann Taylor, Louis Vuitton, Versace, and YSL. In 2005, she starred in the psychological thriller Noise.

She returned from a two-year hiatus to close for Alexander Wang fashion show in February 2009. Goff later moved to London with her husband, casting director Angus Munro. The couple later moved to Portugal before divorcing.

After returning to the United States, Goff received her real estate license from New York University and now works as a broker for Compass, Inc. in New York. She lives in Chelsea, Manhattan with her teenage son, Nyima. Goff previously worked for the Douglas Elliman real estate company.

In the midst of the Harvey Weinstein abuse sex scandal, Goff alleged that she too was an abuse victim of Harvey Weinstein.

References

External links 
 
 

1976 births
21st-century American actresses
Actresses from Florida
American film actresses
Living people
American real estate brokers
Female models from Florida
People from Chelsea, Manhattan